Mikkâl Antti Morottaja (born 1984 in Inari, Finland), known by his stage name Amoc (an acronym for Aanaar Master of the Ceremony) is a Sámi musician. He is noted for rapping in the severely threatened language of Inari Sámi. He was named as Finland's Young European of 2007.

Biography
Amoc is of ethnic Finnish as well as Sámi descent. In addition to rapping in Inari Sámi, Amoc has also taught the language at various times at schools in Inari. He also studied filmmaking at Inari.

His father is Matti Morottaja, a prominent author, social activist and politician in the Inari Sámi community who is focused on preserving their language and identity.

Style and influences 
Besides his language, Amoc also distinguishes himself from most Finnish rappers by rapping with raw and provocative lyrics and using shock value. Many of his songs are made in storytelling style with lyrics focusing on horror, death, murder, monsters, Sami mythology and fantasy. 

He has cited Tech N9ne Jedi Mind Tricks, Eminem, Rammstein and Necro as his influences.

Discography

Albums
Amok-Kaččâm (2007)

Singles
"Šaali" (2006)
"Kiälláseh" (2016)
"Kuobârpoolvâ maŋa" (2016)
"Čuđeh" (2018)

See also
 Sámi people

References

External links
 Personal website

1984 births
Living people
People from Inari, Finland
Inari Sámi people
Finnish rappers
Finnish Sámi people
Finnish Sámi musicians
Horrorcore artists